A23 may refer to:
 A-23 Baltimore, an early light reconnaissance bomber
 A23 battery
 Aero A.23, a Czech passenger plane of the 1920s
 Arrows A23, a Formula One car
 British NVC community A23 (Isoetes lacustris/setacea community), a plant community
 HLA-A23, an HLA-A serotype
 Samsung Galaxy A23, an Android smartphone
 A-23, a large iceberg recorded in 2021

See also 
 English Opening, Encyclopaedia of Chess Openings code
 Assemblage 23, a futurepop/synthpop/EBM musical act

Roads 
 List of A23 roads